Melaleuca quadrifaria, commonly known as limestone honey-myrtle, is a plant in the myrtle family, Myrtaceae, and is native to the south of Western Australia. It is distinguished by the small size and arrangement of its leaves combined with its small spikes of white or cream flowers.

Description
Its leaves are small and arranged in alternating pairs at right angles to those above and below (decussate) so that they form four rows along the branches.

The flowers are white or cream and are arranged in small heads or spikes on the sides of the branches. The stamens are arranged in five bundles around the flower with 9 to 13 stamens in each bundle.

Taxonomy and naming
Melaleuca quadrifaria was first formally described in 1886 by Ferdinand von Mueller in "Southern Science Record". (The description was not formally published but a page proof was distributed by Mueller.) The specific epithet (quadrifaria) is derived from the Latin  meaning "four" and  meaning "-fold" referring to the decussate or "four-fold" arrangement of the leaves.

Distribution and habitat
This melaleuca occurs from the Newdegate area and east as far as the border region with South Australia including parts of Fraser Range Station, Cape Arid National Park and Balladonia in the Coolgardie, Hampton, Mallee and  Nullarbor Plain biogeographic regions. It grows in clay, sand and loamy soils over limestone on flats and around salt lakes.

Conservation
This species is common throughout its range and is classified as "not threatened" by the Government of Western Australia Department of Parks and Wildlife.

Uses

Horticulture
Although not an especially attractive plant for horticulture, this species is a useful shrub in arid areas with limestone soils.

Essential oils
The leaves of Melaleuca quadrifaria contain significant quantities of essential oils, especially the monoterpene, 1,8-cineole (Eucalyptol).

References

Flora of South Australia
quadrifaria
Myrtales of Australia
Plants described in 1886
Endemic flora of Western Australia
Taxa named by Ferdinand von Mueller